Dwarf goldenrod is a common name for several plants and may refer to:

Solidago nana
Solidago nemoralis, native to North America
Solidago sphacelata, native to the eastern United States